Govorov or Hovorov (from говор meaning subdialect) is a Russian masculine surname, its feminine counterpart is Govorova or Hovorova. It may refer to
Andrei Govorov (born 1984), Russian football player
Andriy Hovorov (born 1992), Ukrainian swimmer 
Leonid Govorov (1897–1955), Soviet military commander
Olena Hovorova (born 1973), Ukrainian triple jumper

Russian-language surnames